Somasunderam Udayar Ethirmanasingham MBE (born 25 July 1915) is a former Ceylon Tamil businessman, politician and Member of Parliament.

Early life
Ethirmanasingham was born on 25 July 1915. He was from Paddiruppu in eastern Ceylon. He was educated at St. Mary's College and Lee High School, Kalmunai.

Career
Ethirmanasingham had several jobs before becoming a successful businessman.

Ethirmanasingham stood as an independent candidate in Paddiruppu at the 1947 parliamentary election. He won the election and entered Parliament. He stood as the United National Party's candidate at the 1952 parliamentary election but was defeated by S. M. Rasamanickam. He re-gained the seat at the 1956 parliamentary election, contesting as an independent. However, he lost the seat again to Rasamanickam at the March 1960 parliamentary election. He was also unsuccessful at the July 1960 and 1965 parliamentary elections.

References

1915 births
All Ceylon Tamil Congress politicians
Members of the 1st Parliament of Ceylon
Members of the 3rd Parliament of Ceylon
People from Eastern Province, Sri Lanka
People from British Ceylon
Sri Lankan Tamil businesspeople
Sri Lankan Tamil politicians
United National Party politicians
Year of death missing